Arthel Lane "Doc" Watson (March 3, 1923 – May 29, 2012) was an American guitarist, songwriter, and singer of bluegrass, folk, country, blues, and gospel music. Watson won seven Grammy awards as well as a Grammy Lifetime Achievement Award. Watson's fingerstyle and flatpicking skills, as well as his knowledge of traditional American music, were highly regarded. Blind from a young age, he performed publicly both in a dance band and solo, as well as for over 15 years with his son, guitarist Merle Watson, until Merle's death in 1985 in an accident on the family farm.

Biography

Early life
Watson was born in Deep Gap, North Carolina.  According to Watson on his three-CD biographical recording Legacy, he got the nickname "Doc" during a live radio broadcast when the announcer remarked that his given name Arthel was odd and he needed an easy nickname.  A fan in the crowd shouted "Call him Doc!", presumably in reference to the literary character Sherlock Holmes's companion, Doctor Watson.  The name stuck.

An eye infection caused Watson to lose his vision before his second birthday. He attended North Carolina's school for the blind, the Governor Morehead School, in Raleigh, North Carolina.

In a 1989 radio interview with Terry Gross on the Fresh Air show on National Public Radio, Watson explained how he got his first guitar.  His father told him that if he and his brother David chopped down all the small dead chestnut trees along the edge of their field, they could sell the wood to a tannery.  Watson bought a Sears Silvertone from Sears Roebuck with his earnings, while his brother bought a new suit.  Later in that same interview, Watson explained that his first high-quality guitar was a Martin D-18.

Watson's earliest influences were country roots musicians and groups such as the Carter Family and Jimmie Rodgers.  The first song he learned to play on the guitar was "When Roses Bloom in Dixieland", first recorded by the Carter Family in 1930.  Watson stated in an interview with American Songwriter that, "Jimmie Rodgers was the first man that I started to claim as my favorite."  Watson proved to be a natural musical talent and within months was performing on local street corners playing songs from the Delmore Brothers, Louvin Brothers, and Monroe Brothers alongside his brother Linny.  By the time Watson reached adulthood, he had become a proficient acoustic and electric guitar player.

Career

In 1953, Watson joined the Johnson City, Tennessee–based Jack Williams's country and western swing band on electric guitar.  The band seldom had a fiddle player, but was often asked to play at square dances.  Following the example of country guitarists Grady Martin and Hank Garland, Watson taught himself to play fiddle tunes on his Gibson Les Paul electric guitar.  He later transferred the technique to acoustic guitar, and playing fiddle tunes became part of his signature sound.  During his time with Jack Williams, Watson also supported his family as a piano tuner.

In 1960, as the American folk music revival grew, Watson took the advice of folk musicologist and Smithsonian curator Ralph Rinzler and began playing acoustic guitar and banjo exclusively.  That move ignited Watson's career when he played on his first recording, Old Time Music at Clarence Ashley's.  Also of pivotal importance for his career was his February 11, 1961, appearance at P.S. 41 in Greenwich Village. He subsequently began to tour as a solo performer and appeared at universities and clubs like the Ash Grove in Los Angeles.  Watson would eventually get his big break and rave reviews for his performance at the renowned Newport Folk Festival in Newport, Rhode Island in 1963.  Watson recorded his first solo album in 1964 and began performing with his son, Merle, the same year.

After the folk revival waned during the late 1960s, Watson's career was sustained by his performance of the Jimmy Driftwood song "Tennessee Stud" on the 1972 live album recording Will the Circle Be Unbroken.  As popular as ever, Doc and Merle began playing as a trio with T. Michael Coleman on bass guitar in 1974.  The trio toured the globe during the late seventies and early eighties, recording nearly fifteen albums between 1973 and 1985, and bringing Doc and Merle's unique blend of acoustic music to millions of new fans.  In 1985, Merle died in a tractor accident on his family farm.  Two years later Merle Fest was inaugurated in remembrance of him.

Watson played guitar in both flatpicking and fingerpicking style, but is best known for his flatpick work.  His guitar playing skills, combined with his authenticity as a mountain musician, made him a highly influential figure during the folk music revival.  Watson pioneered a fast and flashy bluegrass lead guitar style including fiddle tunes and crosspicking techniques which were adopted and extended by Clarence White, Tony Rice and many others. Watson was also an accomplished banjo player and sometimes accompanied himself on harmonica as well.  Known also for his distinctive and rich baritone voice, Watson over the years developed a vast repertoire of mountain ballads, which he learned via the oral tradition of his home area in Deep Gap, North Carolina.

Watson played a Martin model D-18 guitar on his earliest recordings. In 1968, Watson began a relationship with Gallagher Guitars when he started playing their G-50 model.  His first Gallagher, which Watson referred to as "Ol' Hoss", was on display at the Country Music Hall of Fame in Nashville, Tennessee before residing at the Gallagher shop until 2012, when it was auctioned through Christie's on November 27, 2012.  In 1974, Gallagher created a customized G-50 line to meet Watson's preferred specifications, which bears the Doc Watson name.  In 1991, Gallagher customized a personal cutaway guitar for Watson that he played until his death and which he referred to as "Donald" in honor of Gallagher guitar's second-generation proprietor and builder, Don Gallagher.  During his last years, Watson played a Dana Bourgeois dreadnought given to him by Ricky Skaggs for his 80th birthday. Another of Watson's favorites was his Arnold guitar, "The Jimmie", built by luthier John Arnold as a tribute to the famous 1926 Martin 00-18 played by Jimmie Rodgers.

In 1994, Watson teamed up with musicians Randy Scruggs and Earl Scruggs to contribute the classic song "Keep on the Sunny Side" to the AIDS benefit album Red Hot + Country produced by the Red Hot Organization.

Later life

In his later life, Watson scaled back his touring schedule. He was generally joined onstage by his grandson (Merle's son) Richard, as well as longtime musical partners David Holt or Jack Lawrence. On June 19, 2007, Watson was accompanied by Australian guitar player Tommy Emmanuel at a concert at the Bass Performance Hall in Fort Worth, Texas. Watson also performed, accompanied by Holt and Richard, at the Hardly Strictly Bluegrass festival in San Francisco in 2009, as he had done in several previous years.

Watson hosted the annual MerleFest music festival held every April at Wilkes Community College in Wilkesboro, North Carolina. The festival features a vast array of acoustic style music focusing on the folk, bluegrass, blues and old-time music genres. It was named in honor of Merle Watson and is one of the most popular acoustic music festivals in the world, drawing over 70,000 music fans each year.  The festival has continued after his death.

Watson was inducted into the North Carolina Music Hall of Fame in 2010.

Personal life
In 1947, Watson married Rosa Lee Carlton, the daughter of popular fiddle player Gaither Carlton. The couple had two children, Eddy Merle (named after country music legends Eddy Arnold and Merle Travis) in 1949 and Nancy Ellen in 1951.

On April 29, 2012, Watson performed with the Nashville Bluegrass Band on the Creekside Stage at MerleFest.  It was an annual tradition for Watson to join the Nashville Bluegrass Band for a gospel set on the festival's Sunday morning. It would be his final performance.

On May 21, 2012, Watson fell at his home. He was not seriously injured in the fall, but an underlying medical condition prompted surgery on his colon. Watson died on May 29, 2012, at Wake Forest Baptist Medical Center of complications following the surgery at the age of 89. He is buried in the Merle and Doc Watson Memorial Cemetery, Deep Gap, Watauga County, North Carolina, with his wife and son.

Legacy
In 2002, High Windy Audio released a multi-CD biographical album of Watson's work, titled Legacy. The collection features audio interviews with Watson interspersed with music, as well as a complete recording of a live performance at the Diana Wortham Theatre in Asheville, North Carolina. The collection won the 2002 Grammy Award for Best Traditional Folk Album.

In 2010, Blooming Twig Books published a comprehensive biography of Watson, written by Kent Gustavson. The book, titled Blind But Now I See: The Biography of Music Legend Doc Watson, features never before published content regarding Watson's life and career, gleaned from interviews with Watson's friends and collaborators, including Norman Blake, Sam Bush, members of the Seeger family, Michelle Shocked and many others. The book also goes into detail on the life, supporting role and untimely death of Merle Watson. An updated edition was released by Sumach-Red Books in March 2012.

In April 2013, Open Records released a multi-disc collection of unreleased recordings by Watson. The collection, titled Milestones, features 94 songs as well as stories, remembrances, and over 500 photographs. The collection was created by Watson's daughter, Nancy, and is being produced by ETSU Bluegrass and ETSU professor Roy Andrade.

Discography

Awards and honors
In 1986, Watson received the North Carolina Award and in 1994 he received a North Carolina Folk Heritage Award. He is a recipient of a 1988 National Heritage Fellowship awarded by the National Endowment for the Arts, which is the United States government's highest honor in the folk and traditional arts. In 2000, Watson was inducted into the International Bluegrass Music Hall of Honor in Owensboro, Kentucky. In 1997, Watson received the National Medal of Arts from U.S. President Bill Clinton. In 2010, he was awarded an honorary doctor of music degree from Berklee College of Music in Boston, Massachusetts.

A portion of the U.S. Route 421 near Deep Gap (Watson's birthplace) bears a sign reading, "Doc and Merle Watson Highway", dedicating it to Watson and his son.

Grammy Awards
 1973 Best Ethnic or Traditional Recording (Including Traditional Blues): Doc Watson for Then and Now
 1974 Best Ethnic or Traditional Recording: Merle Watson and Doc Watson for Two Days in November
 1979 Best Country Instrumental Performance: Doc Watson and Merle Watson for "Big Sandy/Leather Britches"
 1986 Best Traditional Folk Recording: Doc Watson for Riding the Midnight Train
 1990 Best Traditional Folk Recording: Doc Watson for On Praying Ground
 2002 Best Traditional Folk Album: Doc Watson and David Holt for Legacy
 2004 Lifetime Achievement Award
 2006 Best Country Instrumental Performance: Bryan Sutton and Doc Watson for "Whiskey Before Breakfast" track from Not Too Far from the Tree by Bryan Sutton

References

External links

 Collection of Doc Watson performances from the Florida Folklife Collection  (made available for public use by the State Archives of Florida)
 Guitarist Arthel 'Doc' Watson Interview on NPR's Fresh Air
 Interviews on NPR's Morning Edition
 Bob Edwards interview with Doc Watson from 1985
 Bob Edwards interview with Doc Watson from 1989
 Bob Edwards interview with Doc Watson from 2002
 Appearances on APR's A Prairie Home Companion:
 October 23, 1999 broadcast with Doc Watson, Jack Lawrence, and the Fairfield Four
 February 14, 2004 broadcast with Sam Bush and Doc Watson
 "A History of Bluegrass Guitar in Western North Carolina" by John Martin in North Carolina Folklore Journal, Volume 56, Number 2 (Fall–Winter 2009): Article on Doc Watson and other western NC guitar players
 Second archive link

1923 births
2012 deaths
20th-century American guitarists
20th-century American male musicians
American banjoists
American bluegrass guitarists
American blues guitarists
American blues singer-songwriters
American country guitarists
American country singer-songwriters
American folk guitarists
American folk singers
American male guitarists
American street performers
Appalachian culture
Blind musicians
Country musicians from North Carolina
Grammy Award winners
Grammy Lifetime Achievement Award winners
Guitarists from North Carolina
Musicians from Appalachia
National Heritage Fellowship winners
Old-time musicians
People from Deep Gap, North Carolina
Singer-songwriters from North Carolina
United States National Medal of Arts recipients
Vanguard Records artists
Flying Fish Records artists
Bluegrass musicians from North Carolina
American male singer-songwriters
American blind people